Rowan Varty (born 20 March 1986) is a British-born Hong Kong rugby union player. He plays for the Hong Kong Cricket Club in the HKRFU Premiership. Rowan has also captained the Hong Kong national rugby union team, Hong Kong Sevens team and been selected to play for Barbarians. His sister Lindsay represents Hong Kong in rugby sevens women's team.

Biography 
Born in London, England to a British father and a Chinese Portuguese mother, Varty grew up in Hong Kong, where he attended King George V School before attending the University of Nottingham to read Law and attending the University of Hong Kong for postgraduate studies.

In December 2013, after having completed a 2-year apprenticeship with Hong Kong law firm, Tanner De Witt, Varty decided to take a sabbatical from his legal career. He was one of 40 players inducted into the Hong Kong Sports Institute, with the prospect of representing Hong Kong in the Olympics, and now works full-time as a teacher at King George V School.

Play
Varty nominally plays back at 15-a-side rugby, and takes wing or full-back positions for his club, DeA Tigers, as well as at Asian level. Varty led the King George V School (KGV) in their 21-5 victory over Island School in the 2004 Bill Williams Schoolboy Rugby Sevens. Varty made his international début for the Hong Kong at the age of 18 when he joined a match against Singapore as a substitute. Having spent considerable effort to acquire a Hong Kong passport, he eventually acquired one in 2013.

Varty has represented Hong Kong in three Rugby Sevens world cup tournaments – Hong Kong (2005) and Dubai (2009) and Russia (2013).

Varty was selected in April 2013 for the Barbarians squad to play England and the British and Irish Lions, becoming the first Hong Kong rugby player to play at this level. He appeared in the match against England, where he came off the bench and replaced Timoci Nagusa to win his first Barbarian cap.

, Rowan Varty is Hong Kong national team's highest all-time scorer with 120 points as well as their all-time leader in top try with 24 of them.

References

1986 births
Living people
English rugby union players
Hong Kong international rugby union players
Hong Kong rugby union players
Hong Kong people of British descent
Hong Kong people of Portuguese descent
English people of Hong Kong descent
English people of Portuguese descent
Hong Kong expatriate sportspeople in Japan
Asian Games medalists in rugby union
Rugby union players at the 2006 Asian Games
Rugby union players at the 2010 Asian Games
Rugby union players at the 2014 Asian Games
Toyota Industries Shuttles Aichi players
Expatriate rugby union players in Japan
Male rugby sevens players
Hong Kong international rugby sevens players
Asian Games silver medalists for Hong Kong
Medalists at the 2010 Asian Games
Medalists at the 2014 Asian Games
Alumni of King George V School, Hong Kong
Rugby union players from London
Hong Kong expatriate rugby union players